Since its founding in 2015, the American soccer club Louisville City FC has competed in the USL Championship, the second division of American soccer, previously known as USL and USL Pro. The following is a complete list of club seasons, including team and individual statistics for all competitive competitions that Louisville City has partaken in.

Key
Key to competitions

 USL Championship (USLC) – The second division of soccer in the United States, established in 2010 and previously known as USL and USL Pro. The Championship was the third division of American soccer from its founding until its elevation to second division status in 2017.
 U.S. Open Cup (USOC) – The premier knockout cup competition in US soccer, first contested in 1914.
 CONCACAF Champions League (CCL) – The premier competition in North American soccer since 1962. It went by the name of Champions' Cup until 2008.

Key to colors and symbols

Key to league record
 Season = The year and article of the season
 Div = Level on pyramid
 League = League name
 Pld = Games played
 W = Games won
 L = Games lost
 D = Games drawn
 GF = Goals scored
 GA = Goals against
 Pts = Points
 PPG = Points per game
 Conf = Conference position
 Overall = League position

Key to cup record
 DNE = Did not enter
 DNQ = Did not qualify
 NH = Competition not held or canceled
 QR = Qualifying round
 PR = Preliminary round
 GS = Group stage
 R1 = First round
 R2 = Second round
 R3 = Third round
 R4 = Fourth round
 R5 = Fifth round
 QF = Quarterfinals
 SF = Semifinals
 RU = Runners-up
 W = Winners

Seasons

1. Avg. attendance include statistics from league matches only.
2. Top goalscorer(s) includes all goals scored in league, league playoffs, U.S. Open Cup, CONCACAF Champions League, FIFA Club World Cup, and other competitive continental matches.

References

External links

 

 
Louisville City FC
Louisville City FC seasons